2M1207b is a planetary-mass object orbiting the brown dwarf 2M1207, in the constellation Centaurus, approximately 170 light-years from Earth. It is one of the first candidate exoplanets to be directly observed (by infrared imaging). It was discovered in April 2004 by the Very Large Telescope (VLT) at the Paranal Observatory in Chile by a team from the European Southern Observatory led by Gaël Chauvin.  It is believed to be from 3 to 10 times the mass of Jupiter and may orbit 2M1207 at a distance roughly as far from the brown dwarf as Pluto is from the Sun.

The object is a very hot gas giant; the estimated surface temperature is roughly 1600 K (1300 °C or 2400 °F), mostly due to gravitational contraction.  Its mass is well below the calculated limit for deuterium fusion in brown dwarfs, which is 13 Jupiter masses.  The projected distance between 2M1207b and its primary is around 40 AU (similar to the mean distance between Pluto and the Sun). Its infrared spectrum indicates the presence of water molecules in its atmosphere. The object is not a likely candidate to support life, either on its surface or on any satellites.

Catalog views: Aladin Lite 
DSS color

DSS near IR

sDSS red (high res)

Discovery and identification

2M1207b is around 100 times fainter in the sky than its companion. It was first spotted as a "faint reddish speck of light" in 2004 by the VLT. After the initial observation, there was some question as to whether the objects might be merely an optical double, but subsequent observations by the Hubble Space Telescope and the VLT have shown that the objects move together and are therefore presumably a binary system.

An initial photometric estimate for the distance to 2M1207b was 70 parsecs. In December 2005, American astronomer Eric Mamajek reported a more accurate distance (53 ± 6 parsecs) to 2M1207b using the moving-cluster method.  Recent trigonometric parallax results have confirmed this moving-cluster distance, leading to a distance estimate of 52.75 parsecs or 172 ± 3 light years.

Properties
Estimates for the mass, size, and temperature of 2M1207b are still uncertain.  Although spectroscopic evidence is consistent with a mass of 8 ± 2 Jupiter masses and a surface temperature of 1600 ± 100 kelvins, theoretical models for such an object predict a luminosity 10 times greater than observed.  Because of this, lower estimates for the mass and temperature have been proposed.  Alternatively, 2M1207b might be dimmed by a surrounding disk of dust and gas.  As an unlikely possibility, Mamajek and Michael Meyer have suggested that the planet is actually much smaller, but is radiating away heat generated by a recent collision.

Although the mass of 2M1207b is less than that required for deuterium fusion to occur, some 13 times the mass of Jupiter, and the image of 2M1207b has been widely hailed as the first direct image of an exoplanet, it may be questioned whether 2M1207b is actually a planet.  Some definitions of the term planet require a planet to have formed in the same way as the planets in the Solar System did, by secondary accretion in a protoplanetary disk.  With such a definition, if 2M1207b formed by direct gravitational collapse of a gaseous nebula, it would be a sub-brown dwarf rather than a planet.  A similar debate exists regarding the identity of GQ Lupi b, also first imaged in 2004.  On the other hand, the discovery of marginal cases like Cha 110913-773444—a free-floating, planetary-mass object—raises the question of whether distinction by formation is a reliable dividing line between stars/brown dwarfs and planets.  As of 2006, the International Astronomical Union  Working Group on Extrasolar Planets described 2M1207b as a "possible planetary-mass companion to a brown dwarf."

See also
 Extrasolar moon
 HD 172555
 Rogue planet

References

External links

 ESO Press Release 12/05:Yes, it is the Image of an Exoplanet
  BBC: Planet 'seen' around distant sun
 Space.com - Astronomers Confident: Planet Beyond Solar System Has Been Photographed
 Space.com article on the discovery
 
 "A Giant Planet Candidate Near a Young Brown Dwarf" (PDF) from the European Southern Observatory.
 Space.com: Fresh Debate over First Photo of Extrasolar Planet
 "A Moving Cluster Distance to the Exoplanet 2M1207 B in the TW Hydrae Association"
 "The Planetary Mass Companion 2MASS 1207-3932B: Temperature, Mass, and Evidence for an Edge-on Disk"
 "Planet collision could explain alien world's heat"

2M1207
Centaurus (constellation)
TW Hydrae association
Giant planets
Exoplanets discovered in 2004
Exoplanets detected by direct imaging